Neftekhimik Ice Palace is an indoor sporting arena located in Nizhnekamsk, Russia.  The capacity of the arena is 5,500 and was built in 2005.  It is the home arena of the Neftekhimik Nizhnekamsk ice hockey team.

Indoor ice hockey venues in Russia
Indoor arenas in Russia
Sport in Tatarstan
HC Neftekhimik Nizhnekamsk
Buildings and structures in Tatarstan
Kontinental Hockey League venues